Hugh Edward White (1869-1939), was an American architect. White, Streeter, Chamberlain' was the firm he formed with Charles J. Streeter and Carroll W. Chamberlain in 1921.

A number of his works are listed on the U.S. National Register of Historic Places:

Works include (attribution):
Gastonia High School, S. York St. Gastonia, NC White, Hugh,Sr.
Rutherfordton-Spindale Central High School, Rutherfordton, North Carolina, NRHP-listed
One or more works in Downtown Gastonia Historic District, roughly bounded by Main Ave., Broad St., Second Ave., and Chester St. Gastonia, NC White, Hugh E.
One or more works in York-Chester Historic District, bounded by W. Franklin Blvd., W. Second Ave., South St., W. Tenth Ave., W. Eighth Ave. and S. Clay St. Gastonia, NC White, Hugh Edward

References

American architects
People from Gaston County, North Carolina
1869 births
1939 deaths